Jackie Smith (born 13 November 1969) is a New Zealand softball player. She competed at the 2000 Summer Olympics in Sydney, where the New Zealand team placed sixth in the women's softball tournament.

References

External links

1969 births
Living people
New Zealand softball players
Olympic softball players of New Zealand
Softball players at the 2000 Summer Olympics
20th-century New Zealand women
21st-century New Zealand women